Gary Craig Wilson (born 5 February 1986) is a former Irish  cricketer, who is a wicket-keeper and right-handed batsman. He played for Ireland in Tests, One Day Internationals and Twenty20 Internationals, with his first appearance for the national side coming in 2005.  He was one of the eleven cricketers to play in Ireland's first ever Test match, against Pakistan, in May 2018. In June 2018, he was named captain of Ireland's T20I side, a role he held until November 2019. On 19 March 2021, Wilson announced his retirement from professional cricket.

Domestic and T20 career
Two years later, in 2006, he participated in the competition for the second time, when his team finished in thirteenth place.

He has played county cricket for Derbyshire in England's domestic competitions, having previously appeared for Surrey.He had played for Surrey's first team from 2008 to 2016.
He was  Surrey captain for the latter part of the 2014 season, following injury to Graeme Smith, and was awarded his cap in the same season. Wilson signed a three-year contract with Derbyshire on 19 September 2016, and the following year, he captained the club to the quarterfinals of the T20 Blast, only the second time Derbyshire had gone so far in the competition

In a match against Leicestershire in August 2010, Wilson scored his maiden first-class century, beating his previous best score of 62. His 125 runs came from 235 balls while batting at number six.

It has been harder work securing a county starting berth, as he has been tried in different top-order positions without consistent success, but Surrey have persisted with him in the middle order and he was a regular starter in 2013, making only his second Championship hundred.

Wilson played for the Northern Knights in the 2018 Inter-Provincial Trophy, featuring in one match against Munster Reds at Cork.

In July 2019, he was selected to play for the Belfast Titans in the inaugural edition of the Euro T20 Slam cricket tournament. However, the following month the tournament was cancelled.

International career
Wilson played for Ireland in the 2005 ICC Intercontinental Cup. He made his Irish ODI debut against India on 23 June 2007 at Stormont.

Wilson was selected in Ireland's 15-man squad for the 2011 World Cup. During the tournament it was announced that Wilson had agreed to extend his contract with Surrey to 2012.

In May 2018, he was named in a fourteen-man squad for Ireland's first ever Test match, to be played against Pakistan later that month. He made his Test debut in the match, starting on 11 May 2018. The following month, he was named as the captain of Ireland's Twenty20 International (T20I) squad for the 2018 Netherlands Tri-Nation Series.

In December 2018, he was one of nineteen players to be awarded a central contract by Cricket Ireland for the 2019 season. In January 2020, he was one of nineteen players to be awarded a central contract from Cricket Ireland, the first year in which all contracts were awarded on a full-time basis.

On 3 May 2019, Wilson played in his 100th ODI match, in the one-off fixture between Ireland and England in Malahide. In September 2019, he was named as the captain of Ireland's squad for the 2019 ICC T20 World Cup Qualifier tournament in the United Arab Emirates.

On 10 July 2020, Wilson was named in Ireland's 21-man squad to travel to England to start training behind closed doors for the ODI series against the England cricket team.

On 19 March 2021, Wilson announced his retirement from professional cricket.

References

External links
 

1986 births
Ireland Test cricketers
Ireland One Day International cricketers
Ireland Twenty20 International cricketers
Irish cricketers
Living people
Surrey cricketers
Derbyshire cricketers
Cricketers at the 2011 Cricket World Cup
Cricketers at the 2015 Cricket World Cup
People educated at Methodist College Belfast
People from Dundonald, County Down
Cricketers from Northern Ireland
Irish cricket captains
Northern Knights cricketers
Wicket-keepers